Apula is an extinct genus of air-breathing land snail, a terrestrial pulmonate gastropod mollusk in the subfamily Klikiinae † of the family Elonidae.

Soecies
 † Apula amberti (Michaud, 1855) 
 † Apula catantostoma (F. Sandberger, 1872) 
 † Apula coarctata (Klein, 1853) 
 † Apula devexa (Reuss, 1861) 
 † Apula escoffierae (Fontannes, 1881) 
 † Apula fraudulosa (Steklov, 1966) 
 † Apula goniostoma (Sandberger, 1872) 
 † Apula koehnei (Schlickum & Strauch, 1972) 
 † Apula magna (Lueger, 1981) 
 † Apula planispira (Lueger, 1981) 
 † Apula steinheimensis (Jooss, 1918) 
 † Apula vindobonensis (Harzhauser & H. Binder, 2004)

References

 Schlickum, W.R.; Strauch, F. (1972). Zwei neue Landschneckengattungen aus dem Neogen Europas. Archiv für Molluskenkunde. 102: 71–76.

External links
 Boettger, C.R. (1909). Ein Beitrag zur Erforschung der europäischen Heliciden. Nachrichtsblatt der Deutschen Malakozoologischen Gesellschaft. 41(1): 1-19

Elonidae